Strabena tsaratananae is a butterfly in the family Nymphalidae. It is found on Madagascar, where it is known from the Sambirano River area. Forests are the typical habitat of Strabena tsaratananae.

References

Strabena
Butterflies described in 1951
Endemic fauna of Madagascar
Butterflies of Africa